Ednaswap was an American rock band from Los Angeles, California, that existed between 1993 and 1998. Over a span of five years, the band released four major label records on East West, Elektra Records and Island Records.

The band is best known for the song "Torn", which was written by band members Scott Cutler and Anne Preven together with English musician Phil Thornalley, and first recorded by Danish artist Lis Sørensen. It later appeared on Ednaswap's debut album and has been covered many times since then, by artists such as Trine Rein, Natalie Imbruglia, Matt Hall, Tori Amos, Hands Like Houses, Neck Deep, One Direction, and Phoebe Bridgers.

History
In 1993, songwriters Scott Cutler and Anne Preven invited Rusty Anderson and Paul Bushnell  to join their new band, Ednaswap. Frontwoman Anne Preven came up with the band's name after she dreamed she was in a band of the same name that was so bad they were booed off-stage.

Soon after recording an acoustic demo, the band was signed with the EastWest label.  Ednaswap's self-titled 1995 album was the band's only record for EastWest, and the album was never put into wide release. EastWest released them from their contract soon after the album was released and the band was signed by Island Records soon afterwards. During this time, they briefly called themselves Edna Swap rather than Ednaswap.

"Torn", one of the tracks from 1997's Wacko Magneto, their first full-length album to be put into wide release, was covered by Natalie Imbruglia, reaching number two in the UK Singles Chart and number one on airplay around the world. It was number one on the Billboard Airplay chart for 14 weeks. The single went on to sell over a million copies in the United Kingdom alone. However, Imbruglia's version of the song failed to bring commercial success to the band and Ednaswap subsequently disbanded on April 12, 1999.
	
Like many bands, Ednaswap's sound evolved with nearly every release. Their self-titled debut could be best described as Post-grunge, but Chicken and Wacko Magneto were grungy Hard rock with some similarities to Veruca Salt and Live Through This-era Hole. Wacko was also described by one reviewer as a "Sex Pistols, Mick Ronson, Led Zeppelin and Jimi Hendrix smoothie". Wonderland Park further altered their sound. It was an extremely melodic Pop rock album with some harder edges than most, again similar to Hole in both musical direction and timing. Before their dissolution, the band stated that they could have seen a return to the hardness of Wacko Magneto, and while no songs were recorded after Wonderland Park, Annetenna's work showed an even more polished Pop sound than Wonderland Park.

Members
Former members
Anne Preven – vocals
Scott Cutler – guitar
Rusty Anderson – guitar
Paul Bushnell – bass
Scot Coogan – drums
Carla Azar – drums

Discography

Studio albums

Extended plays

Singles

References

External links
An Unofficial Ednaswap Website

Musical groups from Los Angeles
Musical groups established in 1993
Musical groups disestablished in 1999
Female-fronted musical groups
1993 establishments in California
East West Records artists
Island Records artists